Lars Kraume (born 24 February 1973) is an Italian-born German film director, screenwriter and producer. He has directed 35 films since 1996.

Biography
Born in Abruzzo, Italy, to German parents.

Career
Kraume has directed numerous television productions, including several episodes of the crime series Tatort and his own crime mini-series Dengler. His feature film The People vs. Fritz Bauer was nominated for nine German Film Awards, winning in the categories of best film, best director, best screenplay, best supporting actor, best costume design and best production design. Lars Kraume's next film, The Silent Revolution, is based on the true story about a group of DDR youth whose protest in solidarity with the Hungarian Revolution of 1956 became global news after they were interrogated and denounced by the East German government. It was distributed by StudioCanal in 2018.

Kraume has directed some of Germany's most celebrated actors and actresses, including Martina Gedeck, Lars Eidinger, Florian Lukas, Burghart Klaußner, Ronald Zehrfeld as well as Wolfgang Büttner's last performance for Kraume's directing debut Dunkel.

Selected filmography

References

External links 

 Marco Schmidt: A portrait of director Lars Kraume at Germanfilmsquarterly

1973 births
Living people
German mass media people
People from Chieti
Italian people of German descent